Dendryphantes quaesitus is a jumping spider species in the genus Dendryphantes that lives in Yemen.

References

Spiders described in 1994
Invertebrates of the Arabian Peninsula
Salticidae
Spiders of Asia